Sorting nexin-18 is a protein that in humans is encoded by the SNX18 gene.

This gene encodes a member of the sorting nexin family. Members of this family contain a phox (PX) domain, which is a phosphoinositide binding domain, and are involved in intracellular trafficking. This protein does not contain a coiled coil region, like some family members, but contains a SH3 domain. The specific function of this protein has not been determined.

References

Further reading